Ángel Lemus Silva (born 3 September 1971) is a Mexican former footballer who played as a forward. He was a member of the Mexico national team competing at the 1992 Summer Olympics in Barcelona, Spain.

Career
Lemus played club football for Club Necaxa and Querétaro F.C.

References

1971 births
Living people
Association football forwards
Olympic footballers of Mexico
Footballers at the 1992 Summer Olympics
Club Necaxa footballers
Querétaro F.C. footballers
Irapuato F.C. footballers
San Luis F.C. players
Club Atlético Zacatepec players
Chapulineros de Oaxaca footballers
Altamira F.C. players
Liga MX players
Footballers from Mexico City
Mexican footballers